The utility cover, also known as the utility cap and eight-pointed cover, is the United States Marine Corps cap, worn with their combat utility uniform. It is an eight-pointed hat, with a visor similar to a baseball cap. It is worn "blocked", that is, creased and peaked, for a sharper appearance. A version is also worn as part of the U.S. Navy's Navy Working Uniform.

History
The utility cover was first issued in World War II, with the Herringbone Twill utility uniform issued in 1943. It was based on a US Army field cap design and a railroad engineer cap. World War II Marines nicknamed it the raider cap from its use by the Marine Raiders.  It was made from herringbone twill until 1959, when the material changed to cotton sateen.

See also
Boonie hat
Patrol cap the United States Army and United States Air Force equivalent.
Side cap

References

External links

Caps
Headgear
Military equipment of the United States
United States military uniforms
Military equipment introduced from 1940 to 1944
Military hats